Francisco Javier Aguilera Blanco (born 23 September 1971), commonly known as Luna and sometimes Paco Luna, is a Spanish retired professional footballer who played as a striker.

After having spent the early part of his career in his country, his La Liga totals consisting of 60 matches and 17 goals, he appeared for two clubs in Scotland in his late 20s and early 30s.

Club career
Born in Jerez de la Frontera, Province of Cádiz, Luna made his professional debut with UD Almería – also in Andalusia – in Segunda División, after spending the first part of his career as a senior in lower league or amateur football.

In December 1995, his solid performances attracted the attention of La Liga club Albacete Balompié. He scored ten goals in the second part of the season, but the Castile-La Mancha side were relegated after five years.

Luna signed with Sporting de Gijón also of the top division, in another winter transfer move, but his stay in Asturias would not be very successful individually, also being loaned twice, first with Hércules CF. His second loan move was with Scottish Premier League team Dundee in 2000; he impressed in his beginnings in Scotland by netting three times in five starts, but cited family reasons for leaving the country.

After one year in Mexico with C.F. Monterrey, where he again linked up with his "mentor" Benito Floro, Luna made a surprise return to Scotland with Hibernian. He had a successful first season with Hibs, scoring twice in a UEFA Cup first-round tie against AEK Athens FC (3–2 home win, 3–4 aggregate exit).

Luna had a less successful second year, however, and was allowed to come back to Spain in January 2003, returning to former club Almería where he produced three and a half respectable seasons in the second level. In the summer of 2006 he signed for another team in his native area, lowly Écija Balompié.

References

External links

1971 births
Living people
Footballers from Jerez de la Frontera
Spanish footballers
Association football forwards
La Liga players
Segunda División players
Segunda División B players
Tercera División players
Atlético Sanluqueño CF players
CD San Fernando players
UD Almería players
Albacete Balompié players
Sporting de Gijón players
Hércules CF players
Écija Balompié players
Scottish Premier League players
Dundee F.C. players
Hibernian F.C. players
Liga MX players
C.F. Monterrey players
Spanish expatriate footballers
Expatriate footballers in Scotland
Expatriate footballers in Mexico
Spanish expatriate sportspeople in Scotland
Spanish expatriate sportspeople in Mexico